Noriyo (written: 記代 or 法代) is a feminine Japanese given name. Notable people with the name include:

, Japanese alpine skier
, Japanese professional wrestler
, Japanese professional wrestler

Japanese feminine given names